The Kyiv TV Tower is a  lattice metal tower on Oranzhereina Street, Kyiv, Ukraine, and is the tallest structure in the country. The tower was built in 1973 while Kyiv was the capital of Ukrainian SSR.  The tower was the tallest freestanding metal structure in the world until being surpassed by the Tokyo Skytree in 2012. It is used for radio and television broadcasting and is not open to the public.

History 
The tower was first designed for Moscow, then the Soviet capital. But Moscow authorities preferred a more "solid" type of tower, which was eventually built (Ostankino Tower). Later, when Kyiv needed its own tower, the project was reintroduced. The Soviet government ordered the engineers to shorten the tower by almost 30%, so as not to be as tall as the Moscow one.

Location 
The tower was built on top of the Jewish cemetery in Lukianovka. The cemetery was officially closed in 1966 and Jewish families were given six months to rebury their relatives in the Jewish areas of a new cemetery in the city. Since the relatives of the interred had been killed in the Babi Yar massacre, most of the graves were not moved. After the headstones had been destroyed or removed, the antenna was built on top of the existing graves.

Construction 
Construction began in 1968 and finished in 1973 at a cost of approximately $12 million. Made of steel pipe of various diameters and thicknesses, the structure weighs . It sits on a four-legged base that is about  meters tall. Atop the base is an enclosed level which houses microwave transmitting and receiving equipment. This second level is the elevator's terminus.

The tower is unique in that no mechanical fasteners such as rivets are used in the structure: every joint, pipe and fixture is attached by welding. It is the first all-welded tower in the world.

2022 missile strike 

On 1 March 2022, the tower was hit by a missile fired by Russian forces during the Battle of Kyiv as part of the 2022 Russian invasion of Ukraine. According to Ukrainian officials, five people were killed as a result. The dead included Yevhenii Sakun, the first journalist killed in the Russian invasion of Ukraine. Ukraine state advisor Anton Herashchenko accused the Russian army of trying to disrupt the city's communication infrastructure. According to The Kyiv Independent, Ukrainian TV channels' broadcasting was disrupted following the attack. It is unknown if the strike intended to topple the tower or if the intent was to disable its transmission and reception systems. The extent of the damage was not immediately apparent, and the tower remained standing.

The Ukrainian foreign ministry condemned the attack due to its proximity to the memorial to the Babi Yar massacres. The Babi Yar Holocaust Memorial Center confirmed reports that a second missile had hit the nearby memorial, however there are contradicting reports.

See also 
 Lattice tower
 List of tallest towers in the world
 List of tallest structures in Europe
 List of tallest freestanding structures in the world
 List of tallest freestanding steel structures
 List of transmission sites

References

External links 

members.lycos.nl –  Kyiv Central Radio TV Tower
emporis.com – Kyiv TV Tower
Russian Strike on the Kyiv TV tower. In: forensic-architecture.org, 10 June 2022 (with video).

Jewish cemeteries in Ukraine
Jewish cemeteries
Towers completed in 1973
Towers in Ukraine
Radio masts and towers in Europe
Tourist attractions in Kyiv
Buildings and structures in Kyiv
Towers built in the Soviet Union
Lattice towers
1973 establishments in Ukraine
Buildings and structures destroyed during the 2022 Russian invasion of Ukraine
Kyiv offensive (2022)
Articles containing video clips